Persecuted is a 2014 American Christian drama film written and directed by Daniel Lusko and starring James Remar, Bruce Davison, Dean Stockwell, Gretchen Carlson, Raoul Trujillo, Natalie Grant, Brad Stine, and Fred Thompson.

Plot summary
Reformed drug addict and America's leading evangelist John Luther opposes Senator Donald Harrison's Faith and Fairness Act, which would not allow Christians to state that they have the whole or only truth. To destroy Luther's credibility and to ensure passage of the bill, Harrison has Luther framed for the rape and murder of a teenaged girl.

Cast
 James Remar as John Luther
 Bruce Davison as Senator Donald Harrison
 Dean Stockwell as Dave Wilson
 Raoul Trujillo as Mr. Gray
 Fred Thompson as Fr. Charles Luther
 Natalie Grant as Monica Luther
 Gretchen Carlson as Diana Lucas
 Brad Stine as Pastor Ryan Morris

Production
Principal photography took place in Albuquerque, New Mexico. The movie was screened at the February 2014 National Religious Broadcasters convention in Nashville, Tennessee, and in March 2014 at the Conservative Political Action Conference in Washington, DC

Other media
Persecuted has been adapted into a book by Robin Parrish.

Release
Persecuted was released theatrically on July 18, 2014.

Critical reception
The film was widely panned by critics and is one of the worst-reviewed films of 2014. The review aggregator website Rotten Tomatoes reported a 0% approval rating with an average rating of 2.6/10 based on 14 reviews. Metacritic, which uses a weighted average, assigned a score of 11 out of 100 based on nine reviews, indicating "overwhelming dislike".

In a review for the New York Post, Kyle Smith wrote, "The Lord works in mysterious ways but Persecuted works in blundering, obvious ways, straining a Christianity-under-attack theme through a dopey thriller."

New York Times film critic Neil Genzlinger wrote, "This terrible attempt at a political thriller for the religious right is aimed not at Christians in general but at a certain breed of them, the kind who feel as if the rest of the world were engaged in a giant conspiracy against their interpretation of good and truth."

Justin Chang of Variety concluded his scathing review with, "At a time when the world offers us no shortage of examples of what actual religious persecution looks like, for a film to indulge in this particular brand of self-righteous fearmongering isn’t just clueless or reckless; it’s an act of contemptible irresponsibility."

Focus on the Family said, "Philosophically, the movie compels us to grapple with what it looks like to have religious freedom in our modern world. It asks, Do we still have it in America? And it goes to some length, story-wise, to reinforce how important such freedom is....Indeed, religious freedom is a very big deal. It is the bedrock upon which America was founded. And while the sort of vicious persecution Christians currently experience in some other countries is not a reality here in the United States, many American Christians already feel that their faith is under attack...[Persecuted] has its problems, both in terms of content and plot and even message. But its subject is a timely one, well worth putting much more thought into than most of us usually do."

References

External links
 
 
 
 
 

2014 films
2010s mystery thriller films
2014 thriller drama films
American mystery thriller films
American thriller drama films
Films about evangelicalism
Films shot in New Mexico
American independent films
2014 drama films
2014 independent films
2010s English-language films
2010s American films